The Santini Collection is an archive of musical scores dating back to the 18th century, originally the collection of Fortunato Santini, a Catholic priest born in a Roman orphanage in 1778. The archive contains autograph manuscripts by George Frideric Handel and Alessandro Scarlatti, and in some cases preserved the only copies of these works for many years.

External links
 Biography of Fortunato Santini
 the Diözesanbibliothek Münster, present home of the Santini collection

Music archives
Music organisations based in Germany